Taagepera is a village in Tõrva Parish, Valga County, in southern Estonia. It has a population of 109 (as of 1 January 2011).

The village was first documented in 1420 as Wafencul, later as Waagenkül. The current Estonian name of the place is derived from the Baltic German Stackelberg nobility, who owned the estate from 1674 to 1796.

Taagepera is famous for its Jugendstil castle.

Notable people
Jaak Aab (born 1960), politician

References

External links
Taagepera Castle
Taagepera Manor at Estonian Manors Portal
Taagepera village society 

Villages in Valga County
Kreis Fellin